Liga Deportiva Universitaria de Quito's 1968 season was the club's 38th year of existence, the 15th year in professional football and the 9th in the top level of professional football in Ecuador.

Competitions

Serie A

First stage

Results

Liguilla Final

Results

References

RSSSF

External links
  

1968
Ecuadorian football club seasons
L.D.U. Quito
Association football clubs 1968 season